The National Democratic Alliance (NDA) is an Indian political alliance made up of center-right and right-wing political parties and led by the Bharatiya Janata Party (BJP). It was founded in 1998 and currently controls the Indian union government as well as many other Indian states. NDA Kerala   is part of NDA National Alliance.In Kerala NDA is the third front as an alternative to LDF & UDF. NDA is a strong contender in almost 80% seats in assembly elections and Loksabha elections.NDA front is the one and only opposition outside Legislative Assembly in Kerala.

Allies with similar views to BJP
Bharatiya Janata Party (BJP)
Bharath Dharma Jana Sena (BDJS)
 All India Anna Dravida Munnetra Kazhagam (AIADMK)
Janadhipathya Rashtriya Sabha (JRS)

Kerala Congress (Nationalist)
 Kerala Kamaraj Congress (KKC)
 Socialist Janata Dal (SJD)
 Democratic Social Justice Party (DSJP)
In addition to this there are many small parties, several majority & minority religious organizations, caste organizations, social organizations, farmers organizations which offer support to the NDA front in every election.

Non-Allies with similar views
 Shiv Sena (SHS)
 Hindu Mahasabha (ABHM)

Member of legislative assembly 
O. Rajagopal (2016-2021)

Central Ministers from NDA Kerala
O. Rajagopal(1998-2004)
PC Thomas(2002-2004)
Alphons Kannanthanam(2016-2019)
V Muraleedharan(2019–Present)
P. K. Krishna Das(2018-present) (holds the rank of deputy Minister)
Rajeev Chandrashekhar(2021-present)

Members of Parliament
PC Thomas
Richard Hay
Suresh Gopi
V. Muraleedharan
Alphons Kannanthanam
Rajeev Chandrasekhar

Governors
Kummanam Rajasekharan, Governor of Mizoram (2018–19)
P. S. Sreedharan Pillai, Governor of Mizoram (2019–present)

References
 https://www.thehindu.com/news/national/NDA-constitutes-its-unit-in-Kerala/article15000965.ece
 https://www.indiatoday.in/elections/lok-sabha-2019/story/pc-george-joins-kerala-nda-1498799-2019-04-10

Kerala
Politics of Kerala